Love Generation is the third extended play by South Korean girl group DIA. It was digitally released on August 22, 2017, by MBK Entertainment and distributed by Interpark. A day later, the EP was released physically in South Korea. The album consists of twelve tracks, including "Can't Stop" as the lead single.

A repackaged version titled Present was digitally released on October 12, 2017, and includes four new songs with "Good Night" released as the album's single It was physically released on October 20.

This marks the last release with member Eunjin before her departure from the group in May 2018.

Release

Love Generation 
The EP was digitally released on August 22, 2017, through several music portals, including MelOn in South Korea, and iTunes for the global market. In South Korea, it was physically released a day later in four versions: normal edition, limited edition, BCHCS unit version and LUB unit version.

Present 
The reissue was digitally released on October 12, 2017, through several music portals. In South Korea, it was physically released on October 20 in three versions: Good Morning edition, Good Evening edition and Good Night edition.

Singles 
"LO OK" was released as a promotional single on August 17, 2017. It was released by DIA's unit BCHCS, composed of members Yebin, Chaeyeon, Huihyeon, Eunice and Somyi. A music video was also released on August 17.

"Darling My Sugar" was released as a promotional single on August 18, 2017. It was released by DIA's unit L.U.B., composed of members Jueun, Jenny, Eunjin and Eunchae. A music video was also released on August 18.

"Can't Stop" was released as the title track in conjunction with the EP on August 22, 2017. A music video was released on the same day.

"Good Night" was released as the title track of the repackaged version on October 12, 2017.

Commercial performance

Love Generation 
All four versions of the album debuted and peaked on the Gaon Album Chart for the week ending August 26, 2017. The normal edition at number 7, the BCHCS unit edition at number 11, the limited edition at number 12 and the LUB unit edition at number 13. In a second week, the normal edition placed at number 30. In a third week, the normal edition continued to chart with the units versions reappearing and all three versions stayed for two more weeks.

All four versions debuted on the Gaon Album Chart for the month of August 2017. The normal edition at number 20, the BCHCS unit version at number 34, the limited edition at number 34 and the LUB unit version at number 39, selling 22,492 copies combined. For the month of September three editions charted on the chart selling 4,990 additional copies.

Love Generation sold 27,482 combined copies as of September 2017, becoming the group's best-selling album to date.

Present 
The repackage debuted and peaked at number 12 on the Gaon Album Chart for the week ending October 21, 2017. In its second week, the album fell to number 14.

It debuted at number 20 on the Gaon Album Chart for the month of October with 9,562 copies sold.

The album sold 37,044 combined copies as of October 2017, becoming the group's best-selling album to date.

Track listing

Charts

Release history

References 

2017 EPs
DIA (group) albums
Interpark Music EPs